Alex Augusto Pereira de Alcântara (born 28 April 1995), commonly known as Alex Alcântara is a Brazilian footballer who plays as a forward for Duque de Caxias.

Career statistics

Club

Notes

References

External links
Alex Alcântara at ZeroZero

1995 births
Living people
Brazilian footballers
Brazilian expatriate footballers
Association football forwards
Liga Portugal 2 players
Sport Club Corinthians Paulista players
Associação Atlética Flamengo players
Rio Branco Esporte Clube players
Vila Nova Futebol Clube players
S.C. Braga B players
Duque de Caxias Futebol Clube players
Sport Club São Paulo players
Gurupi Esporte Clube players
Rio Branco Football Club players
Brazilian expatriate sportspeople in Portugal
Expatriate footballers in Portugal
Footballers from São Paulo